The Villa sisters, also known as the Villa del Orbe sisters, were the Dominican sisters who made the first flag of the Dominican Republic.

They were the issue of Juan Ramón Villa Jáquez (1781–1843), and his wife María de la Antigua del Orbe Bocanegra.

Villa siblings

Source: Hoy/Instituto Dominicano de Genealogía

Notes

References

19th-century Dominican Republic people
Dominican Republic people of French descent
Dominican Republic people of Spanish descent
Flag designers
White Dominicans